Hidrocálido, founded in 1981, is an independent, daily morning newspaper in the city of Aguascalientes, México, published by the publishing company Empresa Editorial de Aguascalientes, S.A. de C.V. Hidrocálido is a demonym for residents of Aguascalientes.

See also
 List of newspapers in Mexico

References

Newspaper companies of Mexico
Publications established in 1981
1981 establishments in Mexico